{{Album ratings
|rev1 = Allmusic
|rev1score = <ref name="allmusic">{{cite web|url=|title=Review "Fool's Paradise|last=Prato|first=Greg |publisher=Allmusic|accessdate=2 December 2009}}</ref>}}Walk the Walk...Talk the Talk'' is an album of The Head Cat published in 2011.

The disc contains notes cover of rockabilly artists of the past but also two completely new songs, "American Beat" and "The Eagle Flies on Friday". It was recorded in four days, in June 2010 in Hollywood.

Track listing

Personnel 
Lemmy Kilmister - bass guitar, vocals
Slim Jim Phantom - drums
Danny B Harvey - guitar, piano
TJ McDonnell - percussion

References 

2011 albums
The Head Cat albums